Donald Bruce Hume (July 25, 1915 – September 16, 2001) was an American rower who won Olympic gold at the 1936 Summer Olympics.

Hume was raised in Olympia, Washington and the waterways of the Puget Sound. He stroked the University of Washington senior varsity eights which won US national Intercollegiate Rowing Association titles in 1936 and 1937. In 1936, he won the Olympic gold medal rowing in the stroke seat of the American boat in the eights competition. His role in the University of Washington eight and their Olympic victory is explored in the 2013 non-fiction book by author Daniel James Brown, The Boys in the Boat.

During WWII Hume served in the merchant marine. Post-war his career was in oil and gas exploration. He served a term as President of the West Coast Mining Association.

References

External links
 
 
 
 
 Story of the 1936 Olympics

1915 births
2001 deaths
Rowers at the 1936 Summer Olympics
Olympic gold medalists for the United States in rowing
American male rowers
Medalists at the 1936 Summer Olympics